The individual dressage was an equestrian event held as part of the Equestrian at the 1964 Summer Olympics programme.  The event was held on 22 and 23 October.

Medalists

Results

All rider and horse pairs competed in the preliminary dressage, which allowed 12 minutes and 30 seconds.  The top six advanced to a further 6 minutes and 30 seconds ride-off.

Preliminary

Final

References

Sources
 

Equestrian at the 1964 Summer Olympics